Vacis (or Wachis) was an Ostrogothic commander under King Witigis during the Roman-Gothic War (535–554).

Vacis had a Gothic name and, if the words Procopius attributes to him are accurate, identified as a Goth. From the latter's brief account, it can also be inferred that he could speak Latin.

Procopius (De bello Gothico, I.18.39–41), calls him one of the archontes (leaders) of the Goths and "a man of no mean station". He records that in February 537, after Belisarius took Rome, he was dispatched by Witigis to persuade the citizens of Rome not to abandon the Ostrogoths. He gave a speech at the Porta Salaria in which he reminded the Romans that the Ostrogoths were capable of defending them, but the Greeks had only ever came to Italy before as "actors of tragedy and mimes and thieving sailors". The Romans made no response and the siege of Rome began the following day.

Vacis is probably to be identified with the Vacimus who fought the Greeks in the following year. Procopius (II.13.5–15) describes him as an archon dispatched by Witigis against the Greek forces under Conon at Ancona in the summer of 538, for which task Vacimus took men from the garrison of Osimo. Although he inflicted a major defeat on Conon in the open field, he was unable to take the city. He may have been involved in the failed defence of Osimo in 539, but this can only be a guess.

Vacis may also be identified with the Wacces who served King Theodahad as maior domus in 534–535. According to a letter of Cassiodorus to the Senate, he was placed in charge of Ostrogothic troops in Rome after Theodahad received a complaint about their behaviour from the Senate. Possibly Wacces is the unnamed individual mentioned in an earlier letter of Cassiodorus who was put in charge of victualing the army in Rome in such a way as to spread the burden of its upkeep fairly across the populace. Wacces was considered a man of virtue and integrity who would stand as an example for the soldiers. If his identification with Vacis is correct, then he must have been part of the faction of the aristocracy that immediately threw its support behind Witigis despite the latter's poor treatment of the deposed Theodahad.

Notes

References

Bibliography

6th-century Ostrogothic people
People of the Gothic War (535–554)
Gothic warriors